We Dreamed America is a 2008 documentary film directed by Alex Walker that explores facets of the British music scene. Examining the relationship and ongoing exchange between British and American roots music, the film looks at the British fascination with the most American of genres, country music. The film tells the stories of six British 'Americana' bands, while considering how country music fits into the British music industry.

Cast
In addition to the British bands, the film features various musicians and music industry commentators including Tom McRae, Old Crow Medicine Show, Bob Harris, Little Feat, Sid Griffin and Guy Clark.

Release
The film was released in the UK on DVD by Verve Pictures on 6 October 2008.

References

External links
Official homepage for the UK release of the film

 

2008 films
British documentary films
2008 documentary films
2000s English-language films
2000s British films